The small heterodimer partner (SHP)  also known as NR0B2 (nuclear receptor subfamily 0, group B, member 2) is a protein that in humans is encoded by the NR0B2 gene. SHP is a member of the nuclear receptor family of intracellular transcription factors.  SHP is unusual for a nuclear receptor in that it lacks a DNA binding domain.  Therefore, it is technically neither a transcription factor nor nuclear receptor but nevertheless it is still classified as such due to relatively high sequence homology with other nuclear receptor family members.

Function 

The principal role of SHP appears to be repression of other nuclear receptors through association to produce a non-productive heterodimer. The protein has also been identified as a mediating factor in the metabolic circadian clock  Research shows that it interacts with retinoid and thyroid hormone receptors, inhibiting their ligand-dependent transcriptional activation. In addition, interaction with estrogen receptors has been demonstrated, leading to inhibition of function. Studies suggest that the protein represses nuclear hormone receptor-mediated transactivation via two separate steps: competition with coactivators and the direct effects of its transcriptional repressor function.

Structure and ligands 
A crystal structure of the LBD-only SHP, generated by co-crystallisation with EID1, has been obtained. Instead binding to the usual AF-2 site, EID1 fills in the place of what is usually helix α1 of an LBD and makes SHP more soluble. The overall structure resembles the apo (ligandless) form of other LBDs. Some synthetic retinoid ligands can bind to SHP's LBD and promote its interaction with LXXLL-containing corepressors using the AF-2 site.

Interactions 
Large and medium scale Y2H experiments as well as text mining of the NR literature have highlighted the important role of SHP in the Nuclear Receptor dimerization network and its relatively highly connected status, compared to other NRs. 

Small heterodimer partner has been shown to interact with:

 Androgen receptor,
 Estrogen receptor alpha,
 Hepatocyte nuclear factor 4 alpha,
 Liver receptor homolog-1,
 Liver X receptor alpha,
 Peroxisome proliferator-activated receptor gamma,
 Retinoic acid receptor alpha,
 EID1,
 Retinoid X receptor alpha.

References

Further reading

External links 
 

0